Alessandra de Rossi (born Alessandra Tiotangco Schiavone on July 19, 1984) is an Italian-Filipino actress and the younger sister of actress Assunta de Rossi. She won the FAMAS Awards Best Supporting Actress for her role in Azucena. She starred in Mga Munting Tinig and Homecoming, in which she portrayed a Canadian-based domestic worker who visited her home in a rural town in the Philippines, bringing with her the deadly disease SARS which she spreads among the residents.

De Rossi won the part of Valentina, the villainess of the comic turned fantaserye (fantasy TV series), Darna, which aired on GMA Network in 2005.

She starred in the Singapore-based horror film The Maid as Rosa, a housemaid in Singapore. De Rossi moved back to ABS-CBN for I Love Betty La Fea and was later cast in the hit primetime drama Tayong Dalawa for the role of Greta Romano. She also appeared in Komiks Presents: Dragonna, Agua Bendita and Green Rose. She later returned to GMA Network and was cast in Sinner or Saint, Legacy, Magkano Ba ang Pag-ibig? and Wish I May.

She gained popularity for her role in the 2017 romantic comedy film Kita Kita as Lea, a tour guide in Sapporo, Japan who became blind for four weeks. De Rossi returned to ABS-CBN for her special participation in the daytime drama Langit Lupa. She had a guest appearance in the long-running primetime drama FPJ's Ang Probinsyano (starring her former Tayong Dalawa co-star Coco Martin) where she played the role of Rowena, biological mother of Onyok (played by Simon Pineda.) In 2018, she also appeared in the romantic drama Since I Found You alongside Piolo Pascual, Arci Muñoz and her Kita Kita leading men Empoy (with the covered from Air Supply's album Now and Forever 2 selections "Even the Nights Are Better" and "Two Less Lonely People in the World" by OPM Artists).

Filmography

Television

Film

Discography

Awards

Best Actress
 37th PMPC Star Awards for Movies for Watch List 
 Gawad Lassalianeta for My Amanda
 19th Gawad Tanglaw for Watch List
2021 FAMAS Awards for Watch List
2021 Gawad Urian for Watch List
2019 Cinema One Originals Film Festival for Lucid
2016 Singkuwento International Film Festival International Category for Ang mga Alingawngaw sa panahon ng pagpapasya
2015 Sinag Maynila Film Festival for Bambanti
2014 Quezon City International Film Festival for Mauban ang Resiko
2013 1st AIFFA International for Sta.Nina

Best Supporting Actress
2001 49th FAMAS Awards for Azucena
2001 Metro Manila Film Festival (MMFF) for Hubog
2013 Gawad Urian for Sta. Nina
2015 6th ENPRESS Golden Screen TV Awards for Ang Dalawang Mrs. Real
2016 PMPC Star Awards for Movies for Kid Kulafu

Other(s)
2022 Austin Asian American Film Festival Honorable Mention for Lead Actress for Lucid
Gawad Dekada Pinakamahusay na Aktres (Gawad Urian)
2018 Eduk Circle Most influential Film Actress of the Year
2018 GMMSF Breakthrough Movie Loveteam of the year with Empoy
2016 Bataan Peninsula State University Pinakamagiting na Personalidad sa Dulang Antolohiya Wagas Michael and Imelda Story.
2016 PMPC Star Awards for Movies Indie Movie Original Theme Song Tulog Na for Bambanti
2015 Inding-Indie Gawad Parangal Sa Pinakamahusay na Aktres ng Dekada
2015 Sabado Badoo Awards Winner Best Child Performer
2014 Inding-Indie Gawad Parangal Brilliant Actress of the Year
2014 30th PMPC Star Awards for Movies Female Celebrity Great Shape Award 
2014 Ani ng Dangal for Cinema
2013 Indie Bravo for Sta Nina
2011 Pugliese Nel Mondo
2005 GMA 55th ANNIVERSARY "Idol Mong Anti-Bida" for Valentina (Darna 2005)
2005 19th PMPC Star Awards for Television Female Star of the Night
2003 German Moreno Youth Achievement Award
32nd GMMSF Box-Office Entertainment Awards Guillermo Mendoza Memorial Scholarship Foundation Awards RP Movie Princess
2001 Guillermo Mendoza Memorial Scholarship Foundation Awards Most Promising Actress

Nominations

Best Actress
5th Eddys Award for My Amanda 
38th PMPC Star Awards for Movies for My Amanda
24th Gawad Pasado for My Amanda 
 37th PMPC Star Awards for Movies for Watch List (Won)
3rd VP Choice Award for My Amanda
 4th Gawad Lassalianeta for My Amanda (Won)
6th Gems Hiyas ng Sining for My Amanda
 19th Gawad Tanglaw for Watch List (Won)
2021 FAMAS Awards for Watch List (Won)
2021 Gawad Urian for Watch List (Won)
2021 Gems Hiyas ng Sining for Watch List 
2020 Gems Hiyas ng Sining for Lucid
2020 Gawad Urian for Lucid
2019 Cinema One Originals for Lucid (Won)
2019 Pmpc Star Awards for Movies for Through Night & Day
2018 Luna Awards for Kita Kita
2018 Eddys Awards for Kita Kita
2018 Gawad Urian for Kita Kita
2018 PMPC Star Awards for Movies for Kita Kita
2016 Gawad Urian for Bambanti 
2016 Singkuwento International Film Festival (Won)
2015 Sinag Maynila for Bambanti (Won)
2014 Quezon International Film Festival (Won)
2013 4th ENPRESS Golden Screen TV Awards for Legacy
2013 Cinema One Originals for Woman of the Ruins
2013 Gawad Urian for Baybayin
2013 AIFFA for Sta Nina (Won)
2012 Gawad Urian Awards for Ka Oryang
2003 Gawad Urian Awards for Mga Munting Tinig
2000 Gawad Urian Awards for Azucena

Best Supporting Actress
2016 PMPC Star Awards for Movies for Kid Kulafu (Won)
2016 Luna Award for Kid 
Kulafu
2015 Golden Screen Awards for TV for Ang Dalawang Mrs. Real (Won)
2015 Gawad Urian for Mauban ang Resiko
2013 Gawad Urian for Sta Nina (Won)
2013 Gawad Urian for Mater Dolorosa
2013 Star Awards for Movies for Mater Dolorosa
2010 MMFF for Dalaw
2006 FAMAS for Kutob
2005 Golden Screen Awards for TV Outstanding Supporting Actress in a Drama Series for Darna
2004 FAMAS for The Cory Quirino Kidnap: NBI Files
2002 GAWAD URIAN for Hubog
2001 Famas for Azucena (Won)

Best Single Performance By An Actress
34th Star Awards for TV Tadhana:Sisters at War
29th STAR AWARDS for TV for Magpakailanman: Sabit-sabit, Kabit-kabit, Mga Pusong Malupit
25th STAR AWARDS for TV for MMK: Pera
2009 STAR AWARDS for TV for MMK: Pedicab
2006 STAR AWARDS for TV for Magpakailanman: Pag-ahon sa Lusak

Best Director
38th PMPC Star Awards for Movies for My Amanda 
 3rd Vp Choice Award for My Amanda
 24th Gawad Pasado for My Amanda

References

External links
 

Living people
Filipino film actresses
Filipino television actresses
Filipino people of Italian descent
Filipino women comedians
Place of birth missing (living people)
Star Magic
GMA Network personalities
ABS-CBN personalities
1984 births